The Malaysian Open was a combined men's and women's professional tennis tournament played on outdoor hard courts that was originally founded the Malayan Championships. The event has been held at the Bukit Kiara Equestrian & Country Resort and The Royal Selangor Golf Club. The tournament ran from 1921 to 1978. It was revived for a second time from 1992 through to 1995. It was staged for the third and final time from 2009 to 2018.

History
The first edition of the Malayan Championships was played in 1921 in Singapore. Women participated for the first time in 1925. In 1942 the event was suspended due to World War II, it resumed in 1947. In 1949 the tournament was rebranded as the Malaysian International Championships. On 16 September 1963 the country changed its name, from Malaya to Malaysia. In 1971 the tournament was rebranded as the Malaysian Open Tennis Championship, which continued through till 1978 before it ceased to be held.

In 1992 the womens's tournament was reestablished as the Malaysian Tennis Classic. It was competed on indoor hard courts in Kuala Lumpur. The tournament was part of the Women's Tennis Association (WTA) Tour, and was designated as a Tier IV event. Winners received $18,000. In both years it was held from 19 April to 26 April. The event was discontinued from 1993 onwards. In 1993 the men's tournament was revived as the Kuala Lumpur Open (aka Malaysia Salem Open) which ran until 1995. The mens event was played on hard courts in 1993 and on indoor carpet courts from 1994 to 1995. It was an event on the ATP World Series, replacing the Singapore Open for this period. Four Malaysian Players (V. Selvam, Mon S Sudesh, Martin. A and A. Lourdesamy) were banned for participating in the Bridgestone Open that was simultaneous with the Kuala Lumpur Open, as the Bridgestone Tournament wasn't sanctioned by the LTAM. Selvam's banned was lifted after two years by the LTAM.

In 2009 the men' tournament was revived as the Proton Malaysian Open that ran until 2015 as an ATP World Tour 250 fixture. In 2016 the mens event was replaced on the ATP tour by the Chengdu Open. In 2010 the women's tournament was revived for the second time. Initially, the organisers operated with a license directly from WTA. However, later on they cut a deal for a lease of WTA Palermo's license in late-2013.

In 2017, the Women’s Tennis Association deleted reference to Israeli player Julia Glushko's nationality and Israel's flag from Glushko's profile on their website ahead of her scheduled participation at the Malaysian Open, when event organizers requested all references to her being Israeli be removed from the WTA website in order for her to be allowed to take part in the event.  The WTA subsequently reinstated them. 

The last mens Malaysian Open was held in 2015 and the women's in 2017, after which, WTA Palermo returned to the tour calendar in 2019. The event was affiliated with the Women's Tennis Association (WTA), and is an International-level tournament on the WTA Tour.

Past finals

Men's Singles
Incomplete roll

Women's Singles
Incomplete roll

Women's Doubles

Event names
 Malayan Championships (1921-48) men and women
 Malaysian International Championships (1949-69) men and women
 Malaysia International Championships (1970) men and women
 Malaysian Open Tennis Championship (1971-78) men and women
 Malaysian Tennis Classic (1992-93) women
 Kuala Lumpur Open (aka Malaysia Salem Open) (1993-95) men
 Proton Malaysian Open (2009-2013) men
 Malaysian Open (2010) women (2014-15) men
 BMW Malaysian Open (2011-16) women
 Alya Malaysian Open (2017) women

References

External links
 ATP World Tour archive
Official website for women tournaments
Tournament Profile on the WTA Tour
2010 Sony Ericsson WTA Tour Calendar
WTA Tour history

ATP Tour
 
Tennis tournaments in Malaysia
Defunct tennis tournaments in Malaysia
Sport in Kuala Lumpur
Sport in Malaysia
Tennis in Malaysia
Recurring sporting events established in 1921
Recurring sporting events established in 2010
Recurring sporting events disestablished in 1978
Recurring sporting events disestablished in 2018
Recurring sporting events disestablished in 1993
Hard court tennis tournaments
Indoor tennis tournaments
WTA Tour